Face Swap Live is a mobile app created by Laan Labs that enables users to swap faces with another person in real-time using the device’s camera. It was released on December 14, 2015. In addition to swapping faces with another person, the app enables users to create videos using a set of bundled live filters.

The app is available on iOS and Android devices.  Face Swap Live was named Apple’s #2 best-selling paid app in 2016.

See also
Reface
Deepfake

References

External links 
 Official website
 Face Swapper

Mobile applications
IOS software
Android (operating system) software